Canal del Norte is a station on the Mexico City Metro. It is located in the Venustiano Carranza borough, in the north of Mexico City.

General information
The station logo depicts the transverse section of Canal del Norte (Northern Channel) a waterway that connected Mexico City with La Villa in the colonial era.

The station is located near Congreso de la Unión Avenue, and serves the Colonia Janitzio and Colonia Ampliación Michoacana neighborhoods.  The station was opened on 29 August 1981.

From 23 April to 14 June 2020, the station was temporarily closed due to the COVID-19 pandemic in Mexico.

Ridership

Exits
East: Av. Congreso de la Unión and Talabarteros Street, Colonia Ampliación Michoacana
West: Av. Congreso de la Unión and Talabarteros Street, Colonia Janitzio

References

External links 

Mexico City Metro Line 4 stations
Railway stations opened in 1981
1981 establishments in Mexico
Mexico City Metro stations in Venustiano Carranza, Mexico City